"If I Ever Fall in Love" is the debut single by American R&B-soul quartet Shai, released in 1992 from their debut album of the same name. It reached number two on the US Billboard Hot 100 in 1992 and peaked at number one on the Billboard R&B chart. It spent eight weeks at number two on the Hot 100, which at the time was the second-most number of weeks that a song held the position without topping the chart, behind Foreigner's "Waiting for a Girl Like You". The song was also their only top-40 hit in the UK, peaking at number 36.

Charts

Weekly charts

Year-end charts

Decade-end charts

Certifications

East 17 and Gabrielle version

"If I Ever Fall in Love" was covered in 1996 as a duet between British boy band East 17 and singer-songwriter Gabrielle, completed with a backing track. Renamed "If You Ever", the cover peaked at number two on the UK Singles Chart and also peaked within the top 10 of the charts in Ireland and Sweden. The song received a platinum certification from the British Phonographic Industry in September 2019 for sales and streams exceeding 600,000.

The song was the first single from East 17's first Greatest Hits compilation, Around the World Hit Singles: The Journey So Far, and was also the fourth single from Gabrielle's second self-titled album. It was the highest-charting single from both aforementioned albums.

Track listings
 UK and European CD single (LONCD 388)
 "If You Ever" (Smoove 7-inch Mix)
 "If You Ever" (Ruff Mix)
 "Deep" (live at Wembley Arena, 28 May 1995)
 "Steam" (live)

 UK and European limited-edition CD single (LOCDP 388)
 "If You Ever" (Smoove 7-inch Mix)
 "Stay Another Day" (live)
 "Around the World" (live)
 "It's Alright" (live)

 European cassette single (LONCS 388)
 "If You Ever" (Smoove 7-inch Mix)
 "If You Ever" (Simple Simon's Pieman Remix)

Charts

Weekly charts

Year-end charts

Certifications

References

External links
Shai"If I Ever Fall in Love" on Vevo
Gabrielle"If You Ever" (with East 17) on YouTube

1990s ballads
1992 songs
1992 debut singles
1996 singles
A cappella songs
Contemporary R&B ballads
Shai (band) songs
East 17 songs
Gabrielle (singer) songs
London Records singles
MCA Records singles
Male–female vocal duets